This is a list of the various advertising programs fast food restaurant chain Burger King has employed over the course of its history. It includes promotional slogans, jingles and media tie-ins.

Slogans 
This is a partial history of BK advertising slogans:
"Have it your way" (1974–present) 
"Your Way Right Away" (1991–1992)
"If you ask us, it just tastes better" (March–August 1998)
"When you have it your way, it just tastes better" (August 1998 – 1999)
"Burger King, where you're the boss!"
"Be Your Way" (2014–2015)
"Your Way" (2015–present)
The Whopper is BKs signature product, and it has produced several ad campaigns promoting it:
"Home of the Whopper"Many Burger King locations built in the 1960s and 1970s still have this slogan as part of their signage.
"It takes two hands to handle a Whopper"
"In the land of burgers, Whopper is king" (March 2000–August 2003)
"Eat Like a Man, Man" (2006–2008) Used globally; and in the US to promote the Texas Double Whopper
"The Whopper says:" (2001)
"The one and only Whopper" (1978)
As part of its campaign to differentiate itself by its cooking method, flame broiling, BK has emphasized it in several slogans:
"Fuel Your Fire"
"Feel the Fire"
"The Fire's Ready" (2003)
"Earl: Employee of the Month" ("Earl" is the nickname of its broiling unit, an automated gas grill.)
"We do it like you'd do it!" (A Weber grill morphs into the BK logo.)
"It's not a secret, it's real fire" (2021)
"Wake up with the King" (breakfast slogan, 2004–present)
"Stack it high, tough guy" (promoting BK Stackers; 2005, 2007)
"@ BK You Got It!" (2002)
"The taste that beat McDonald's fries" (1997; to promote BK's new French fries at the time)
"Get Your Burger's Worth" (June 1994–February 1998)
"Where value is King" (1994; in commemoration to the upcoming film The Lion King)
"BK Tee Vee: I love this place!" (ads featured Dan Cortese, 1992–93)
"Sometimes, you gotta break the rules" (1989–1991)
"We do it like you do it" (1988–1989)
"The Best Food for Fast Times" (1987–88)
"At Burger King, you not only get change, you get change" (99¢ daily specials, 1989)
"King Me!" (Triple Jump Checkers game, 1988)
"We know how burgers should be" (1986)
"This is a Burger King town" (1986, used with the previous slogan)
"Where's Herb?" (1986)
"Mo Beef, Betta Taste" (In an ad featuring Mr. T, for 1/3 lb Whopper, 1985)
"Aren't your doubly hungry for Burger King now?" (In an ad promoting the Bacon Double Cheeseburger, 1982)
"Aren't your thirsty for Burger King now?" (In an ad promoting a Coca-Cola deal, 1982)
"Aren't You Hungry?", "Aren't you hungry for Burger King now?" (1981–1986)
"Who has the best darn burgers?" (1978)
"The Burger King and I" (Pun on The King and I, 1978)
"We're America's Burger King" (1975)
"Bigger, Better, Burger King!."
"Eat like a king. Not a clown." (2006) (In reference to Ronald McDonald of McDonald's.)
"You're no clown with the Crown." (2006)
"Got the Urge?/Got the Urge? Get to Burger King!" (2000–March 2001)
"BK4U" (commercials featuring Ice-T, 2000–2001)
"Quality Just Tastes Better!"
"Taste Is King" (2012–2014)
"Have a Pepsi at Burger King now." (1983; was used to promote BK's switch to Pepsi as part of the Cola Wars)
"Give your hunger a Texas Double Whopper"
"Eat Like Andy" (2019; Super Bowl LIII)
”You Rule” (2022-present)

Children's advertising 
"Imagination is King"
"Burger King Kids Club, Where it's cool to be a kid!"
"Great food, cool stuff, kids only" (Burger King Kids Club) (1995–97)
"Just for fun, and just for you!" (Burger King Kids Club) (1989)
"Its always something special when you're with Burger King" (1980)
"Magic makes it special when you're with Burger King" (1979)
"Burger King: Where kids are king" (1970–1975)
"Taste Rules!" (Burger King Kids Club) (1990's & 2000s)
"Burger King Kids Club, It's a cool place" (1992)
"Burger King Kids Club, I Love This Place!" (1994)
"Burger King Kids Club, Where Kids Rule!"
"The Burger King Kids Club! It's just for fun, and just for you!" (1980s)
"Home of the real, Big Kids Meal!" (2000s)

International slogans

Canada 
"You're gonna love us!" (1990)

Quebec 
"Les burgers, c'est notre affaire" (1986)
"Au rhythms et au gout d'aujourd'hui" ("The rhythms and taste of today") (1987)
"Laissez-vous fêter!" ("Let's celebrate!") (1989)
"Mets-en que c'est bon!" ("Make it good!") (1990–1992)
"Laissez-vous captiver par le goût!" ("Let yourself be captivated by the taste!") (1991)
"Je préfère Burger King" ("I prefer Burger King") (1993–1996)
"Le Restaurant du Whopper" (1994)
"Je préfère le gout de Burger King" ("I prefer the taste of Burger King") (1999–2000)

Mexico 
"Así lo quiero" (1992–1995)
"Simplemente sabe mejor" (Simply tastes better) (1999)
"A la parrilla sabe mejor" (2005– )
"A tu manera" (Current)

Hungry Jack's 
"Got the Hungry's"
"The Burgers are Better at Hungry Jack's"
"Aren't You Hungry?, Aren't you hungry for Hungry Jack's...now?"
"We're all about fresh at Hungry Jack's"
"Love it at Hungry Jack's"
"Home of The Whopper"
"Oh Yeah!"
"Tastier burgers and more funner!"
"Gotta get back to Jack's"

UK 
"There's 'OK', And there's BK!!" (2002)
"The original flame-grilled taste" (1988)
"It's Flaming Tasty" (1990)
"No sun, no fun" (1995)
"It's Not A Secret, It's Real Fire"/"No Secrets, It's Just Fire" (2021)

New Zealand 
"Burger King – It just tastes better" (2000–present)
Have it your way
Have it our way (November 2021–

Germany 
"Der König der Hamburger" (1980)
"Weil's besser schmeckt" ("Because it tastes better") (1999–2001)
”Geschmack ist king” (2010)

Sweden 
"Grillat ÄR Godast" (1998)

Jingles

The Burger King jingle 
In 1973, BK introduced a jingle in response to McDonald's Big Mac song. The lyrics proclaimed that Burger King would serve you a customized product (for example you can have whatever toppings you wanted on a burger, or even plain), according to its slogan Have it your way, and that it would happily do so:

The jingle was used for several years in the 1970s, and has been modified several times and reused: during the 1980s the phrase at Burger King today was added at the end of the song. A commercial with Shaquille O'Neal had different tempos of jingles as Shaq goes into a 1950s malt shop, then 1960s and 1970s styles and finally a 1980s neon theme, each line reflecting music styles of said decade. During a 2006 commercial called the Whopperettes featuring Brooke Burke, the performers sang a modified version of the song during a musical number overseen by the King.

Whopper Whopper

The Whopper Whopper song is a variation of The Burger King jingle, and was played in ads during 2022 and 2023.

Promotions

CP+B 
Crispin Porter + Borguski created a series of web-based advertisements to complement the various television and print promotional campaigns on sites such as Myspace and various BK corporate pages. These viral campaigns coupled several other new advertisement campaigns drew considerable positive and negative attention to BK.
 The Subservient Chicken

This ad program was used in 2004 to introduce the TenderCrisp sandwich. The first appearance of the Subservient Chicken character was in a commercial called the Subservient Chicken Vest. The commercial was the first in a series of ads for the sandwich utilizing a line of viral marketing promotions by Crispin Porter + Bogusky for Burger King. In the ad, a man is sitting in his living room directing a person in a chicken suit to behave in any way he wants. The tag line was "Chicken the way you like it." After the success of the Subservient Chicken, Burger King used the character in several subsequent advertising campaigns. Other versions of the character appeared for various other promotions of new and limited time versions of the product.
 Coq Roq

In the summer of 2005, Burger King introduced BK Chicken Fries to its menu. The advertising campaign featured a faux metal band named Coq Roq in a commercial called Bob Your Head, members of whom wore chicken masks parodying the style of masks of nu metal band Slipknot. The website included music videos, downloadable cellular ringtones, and a store selling band merchandise. In addition, there is a MySpace page for the "band" that features bios, pictures, and their songs. While successful, the campaign drew scorn for sexual double entendres and a lawsuit from Slipknot in regards to the promotion alleged copying of Slipknot's "look and feel".

 Chick Flix
Chickflix.com, a play on the term "chick flicks", was another interactive website campaign based on BK's Chicken Fries. At the website, users could not only play ads created by Burger King, but also create their own.

 Sith Sense

Sithsense.com was an interactive website that tied in with the Star Wars: Episode III – Revenge of the Sith advertising program. The site featured an interactive video of Darth Vader utilizing a 20 Questions-style answering program which operated in way similar to the Subservient Chicken website.
 Dr. Angus

Dr. Angus was a CP+B creation launched in 2004 to promote the new Angus line of Sandwiches. Played by British comedian Harry Enfield, he is a smarmy self-help "doctor" with gleaming white teeth and a starched toupee who encourages eaters to "sit down" and enjoy the BK's large Angus burgers. In 2006, the character was again used to advertise BK's new Cheesy Bacon Angus and TenderCrisp sandwiches.

In addition, CP+B added a viral marketing web page called The Angus Diet. Designed to work with the larger Angus campaign, this site featured the such things as the Angus diet testimonials, a faux diet book and Angus interventions. The "interventions" could be sent to people via email by filling out several fields on the page. As CP+B stated: "They were a way of getting people to spread the idea of the basis of the Angus Diet – just enjoy life. Do whatever you want. Eat whatever you want as long as it makes you happy."
 Manthem

In May 2006, in promotion of the Texas Double Whopper, Burger King released a campaign called the "Manthem" which parodies Helen Reddy's I Am Woman. It depicts a man and his girlfriend at a fancy restaurant. Disappointed by the meager portions he is served, the man bursts into song, expressing his desire for a Texas Double Whopper, in place of what he deems "chick food." As he walks out of the restaurant, he is joined by a chorus of men who rebel by not only eating Texas Double Whoppers, but also go commando, lift a minivan over the side of an overpass, and unfurl a banner which says "Eat This Meat." This has been the source of some controversy, as the commercial has been described as demeaning to male vegetarians/vegans, as well as misogynistic toward women. This ad was reused in January 2007 when the sandwich was reintroduced and in Germany for a sandwich in the company's BK XXL line, and in January 2008 in Great Britain for the Double Whopper.
 Ugoff

Ugoff was a character in a 2004 ad campaign for Burger King directed by Roman Coppola. He was used to promote the new "Fire-Grilled Salads" and the paper "Salad Pouch" which was used to keep the chicken and shrimp warm for the salad entrées. Ugoff was designed a stereotypical male fashion designer with an indeterminate middle-European accent and haughty personality.
 Earl, Employee of the Month
In Summer 2006, Burger King launched a commercial stating that its broilers, named 'Earl' on the commercials, won the most valuable employee award. With the Earl logo stamped on the side of the broiler on the commercial, it seems that this name was made up and that their broilers are actually made by Nieco and not named Earl.

McGarryBowen 

Fries King
On 2 October 2013, Burger King announced on Twitter that it was changing its name to Fries King. The name change was a publicity stunt held in conjunction with the introduction of the new Satisfries. The chain also rebranded one of its locations with the new Fries King logo, signage and packaging.

Mother 
London-based Mother had been working in partnership with McGarryBowen for the company beginning in December 2011. Mother took over as the company's firm of record on 19 February 2013, from McGarryBowen. The partnership only lasted one year until the agency was dropped on 6 January 2014.

 John the Manager
John the Manager is a series of ads that feature the main character, a Burger King manager named John, and an eclectic cast of customers that form a family unit. The members of this family unit consist of a Muppet, a cheerleader mom, a cowboy, a security guard, a park ranger and an astronaut.

Free Burger Survey
Burger King supports its advertising and change efforts with the opportunity for customers to fill out a My BK Experience survey every time after they eat at Burger King, keep their receipt, and go online to complete the survey. Customers receive a free survey code they can exchange for their choice of a Whopper or Chicken Sandwich, and Burger King receives invaluable feedback they use to continually improve upon their service, customer experience, and to get advertising ideas and inspiration.

Media tie-ins 
The following movies and shows were promoted in store as Kids' Meals or other promotional products.

4Kids Entertainment

Lionsgate

20th Century Studios

Bitsy Entertainment Co./PBS

Disney/Pixar

Jim Henson Company

Marvel

DreamWorks

Fisher Price

Funimation Entertainment

Hasbro

Jada Toys

Konami

Manhattan Toys

Microsoft

Nintendo

Paramount Pictures

Peanuts

Playmates Toys

Sony Pictures Entertainment

Universal Pictures

Warner Bros.

The Weinstein Company

Viz Media

Misc.

Cross promotions
AOL
DirecTV
Konami
Major League Baseball Players Association
Maxim Magazine Hometown Hotties Flash based section on the US Burger King website that allows visitors to engage in a "conversation" with some of the Maxim's Hometown Hotties models and drivers from Waltrip Racing.
MTV In December 2005, Burger King teamed with MTV for a "Have It Your Way" rap contest. Burger King and MTV selected Anthony DeSean Stokes out of 400 entries to star in a commercial. Part of his winning rap was "You can have it your way, there's nothin' to it / If you can dream it, you can do it!" The commercial ran for a short time, exclusively on MTV.
NASCAR
Dale Earnhardt
Joe Nemechek's 87 Chevrolet in the mid-1990s
Michael Waltrip Racing BK co-sponsored the 00 Toyota driven by David Reutimann with Domino's Pizza in 2007, and Bill Elliott(part-time) in 2006.
Tony Stewart (2009–)
BK Racing (2012–) BK is one of the Primary Sponsors of the Team, and Co-Sponsor of 83 Toyota driven by Matt DiBenedetto with Cosmo Motors and Dustless Blasting
Formula One
Sauber (minimal sponsorship that began at the 2010 European Grand Prix)
NFL
Jacksonville Jaguars
Nintendo
Microsoft Windows 7 and Xbox

Celebrity spokespeople

See also 

Fast food advertising
Burger King advertising
McDonald's advertising

References

External links 
The Angus Diet book

Campaigns
Advertising-related lists